Moussa Kamara (born 3 April 1999) is a professional footballer who plays as centre-back. Born in France, he plays for the Gambia national team.

Club career
Born in Paris, Kamara started in Montfermeil FC, and joined the youth academy of Toulouse in 2014.

On 18 August 2021, Kamara joined newly promoted Danish 1st Division club Jammerbugt FC on a deal until the end of 2021. He left again at the end of the season.

International career
Kamara was born in France and is of Gambian descent. He debuted for the Gambia national football team in a friendly 1-0 win over Morocco on 12 June 2019.

References

External links
 
 NFT Profile
 FDB Profile

1999 births
Living people
Footballers from Paris
People with acquired Gambian citizenship
Gambian footballers
Gambian expatriate footballers
The Gambia international footballers
French footballers
French sportspeople of Gambian descent
Association football defenders
Black French sportspeople
INF Clairefontaine players
Toulouse FC players
Balzan F.C. players
Jammerbugt FC players
Championnat National 3 players
Maltese Premier League players
French expatriate sportspeople in Spain
French expatriate sportspeople in Malta
French expatriate sportspeople in Denmark
Gambian expatriate sportspeople in Spain
Gambian expatriate sportspeople in Malta
Gambian expatriate sportspeople in Denmark
Expatriate footballers in Spain
Expatriate footballers in Malta
Expatriate men's footballers in Denmark